Calliostoma perfragile is a species of sea snail, a marine gastropod mollusk in the family Calliostomatidae.

Description
(Original description by G.B. Sowerby III) The size of the shell varies between 13 mm and 18 mm. The very thin, pale iridescent shell has a trochiform shape. The spire is acutely conical. The seven whorls are slightly convex and spirally ridged. There are 9 ridges on the penultimate whorl, rather narrow, the upper ones minutely granulated. The body whorl is angled at the periphery, with a slight keel, which is articulated with rather distant oblong yellowish brown spots. The base of the shell is rather convex, faintly lirate near the margin. The lirae become gradually more prominent towards the centre. The aperture is quadrangular and slightly oblique. The columella is very little curved, rather thick and truncated at the base.

Distribution
This marine species occurs off the Cape coast, South Africa.

References

 Sowerby, G. B. (1903). Mollusca of South Africa. Marine Investigations of South Africa. 2 : 213–232, pls. 3–5
 Trew, A., 1984. The Melvill-Tomlin Collection. Part 30. Trochacea. Handlists of the Molluscan Collections in the Department of Zoology, National Museum of Wales.
 Petit R.E. (2009) George Brettingham Sowerby, I, II & III: their conchological publications and molluscan taxa. Zootaxa 2189: 1–218

External links
 

perfragile
Gastropods described in 1903